Jean-Charles Marchiani, (born August 6, 1943) is a French prefect and politician. He is also a former officer of the French external intelligence agency (DGSE).
Jean-Charles Marchiani is a counter-terrorism expert, especially focused on Islamic fundamentalism. Marchiani has notably been the head negotiator for the liberation of French hostages in Lebanon and Bosnia.

Intelligence and counter-terrorism
Jean-Charles Marchiani was only 19 when he was recruited by DGSE, while completing Law school in Aix-en-Provence (south-east of France), during the Algerian war.
From 1962 to 1970, he served as a DGSE officer. In 1970, he started a career in the private sector.
From 1986 to 1988 and from 1993 to 1995, Marchiani was appointed as a special advisor for Homeland Security Minister Charles Pasqua. He was notably in charge of intelligence and counter-terrorism during the 1995 Algerian GIA terrorist attacks in Paris.

Negotiations and hostages crisis

Lebanon hostages crisis
Jean-Charles Marchiani became a national hero in France in 1988, when he managed to free three French civilians, held hostages for three years in Bairut by Hezbollah militias.
Despite official intelligence agencies' efforts, diplomats Marcel Carton and Marcel Fonataine, as well as journalist Jean-Paul Kauffmann were kept prisoners for more than three years. Jean-Charles Marchiani held double negotiations with Hezbollah dignitaries in Lebanon as well as with Iranian and Syrian officials. Amongst them, former Iranian-Jewish SAVAK / DGSE agent Manucher Ghorbanifar had been stated to have also accompanied Marchiani during his meetings. He was therefore able to free the three French nationals on May 5, 1988.

Liberation of Air Force pilots in Bosnia
Jean-Charles Marchiani was asked in September 1995 by French president Jacques Chirac to start unofficial negotiations with Bosnian nationalists for the liberation of two French Air Force pilots whose jet had been shot down during the Nato bombings in former Yugoslavia.
Jean-Charles Marchiani used his connections with former KGB officers to contact Serbian president Radovan Karadžić and threatened him to have French forces leaving Sarajevo, where they were protecting Serbian minority.
On December 12, 1995, the two pilots were freed and sent back to France.

Political career

Few weeks after the liberation of French pilots in 1996, Jean-Charles Marchiani was appointed  by Jacques Chirac to prefect of the Var region (South East).

Along with Charles Pasqua and Philippe de Villiers, Jean-Charles Marchiani was one of the founding members of the RPF (Rassemblement pour la France – Union for France), a right wing party created in 1999. The RPF got 13% of the vote during 1999 European elections, and Jean-Charles Marchiani was elected as European Member of the parliament.

Marchiani has been involved in a serie of politico-judicial cases since the early 2000s, involving former French president Jacques Chirac.
These cases are connected with Marchiani's shadow's operations and most of them are under the Secret Defense, which Jean-Charles Marchiani has asked to be lifted for a fair trial.
Marchiani was sentenced in 2007 to three years in jail, but was later amnestied by French president Nicolas Sarkozy. In the meantime, French Defence minister Hervé Morin wrote to the judge in charge of the case to ask him to drop the charges against Jean-Charles Marchiani.

References

1943 births
Living people
Rally for France MEPs
MEPs for France 1999–2004
Recipients of French presidential pardons
Prefects of France
Prefects of Var (department)